Alegre may refer to:

Alegre (surname)
Alegre Records, a Latin music record label
Alegre, Espírito Santo, a municipality in Espírito Santo, Brazil
Alegre River (disambiguation), multiple rivers

See also
Porto Alegre (disambiguation)